AEW or aew may refer to:
 Airborne early warning, airborne radar system for detecting aircraft
 Aerosvit Airlines, an airline based in Kyiv, Ukraine (ICAO airline designator: AEW)
 AEW Capital Management, a property investment management company
 Air Expeditionary Wing, a United States Air Force unit
 All Elite Wrestling, an American professional wrestling promotion founded in 2019
 Ambakich language (ISO 639-3 code: aew)
 Association for the Education of Women, an organisation at the University of Oxford from 1878 to 1920